Henry Holman Ketcham (June 17, 1891 – November 1986) was an American college football player who was a center and guard positions for the Yale Bulldogs football team of Yale University.  Ketcham was recognized as a consensus first-team All-American in 1911 and 1912, and as a second-team selection in 1913.  He was inducted into the College Football Hall of Fame in 1968.

Biography
Ketcham was born in Englewood, New Jersey. After attending the Hotchkiss School, he enrolled at Yale University, where he was a member of Skull and Bones.  He played every game for Yale's varsity football team in 1911, 1912, and 1913. He helped lead Yale to a 7–2–1 record in 1911 and a 7–1–1 record in 1912 and was a consensus All-American in both of those years. In 1913, Ketcham was selected as the captain of Yale's football team. In a departure from past tradition at Yale, Ketcham appointed Howard Jones as the school's first salaried football coach. Ketcham later recalled: "I played every varsity game for three years and was taken out only once for a slight injury … I am generally credited with having developed the term 'roving center'. Except for today's platoon systems, football hasn't changed materially. We had the on-side kick, the ball was a bit larger in circumference and the drop kick was more popular than the place kick."

References

1891 births
1986 deaths
American football centers
American football guards
Yale Bulldogs football players
All-American college football players
College Football Hall of Fame inductees
People from Englewood, New Jersey
Players of American football from New Jersey